Ndriqim Halili (born 29 January 1993 in Gjilan) is a German–Albanian footballer.

Club career
Halili has played in Thailand for Angthong. He has also played with FK Kukësi in the Albanian Superliga.

In January 2019, he left Stuttgarter Kickers after having joined them only in September 2018. He signed up with Luxembourg outfit Differdange 03 a few days later.

References

External links
 
 Career stats - FuPa

1993 births
Living people
People from Prizren
People from Gjilan
German people of Albanian descent
Sportspeople of Albanian descent
Kosovan emigrants to Germany
Association football midfielders
Kosovan footballers
German footballers
Hamburger SV II players
FK Kukësi players
FV Ravensburg players
SSV Ulm 1846 players
Ndriqim Halili
Stuttgarter Kickers players
FC Differdange 03 players
Kategoria Superiore players
Regionalliga players
Luxembourg National Division players
Kosovan expatriate footballers
Expatriate footballers in Germany
Kosovan expatriate sportspeople in Germany
Expatriate footballers in Albania
Kosovan expatriate sportspeople in Albania
Expatriate footballers in Thailand
Expatriate footballers in Luxembourg
Kosovan expatriate sportspeople in Luxembourg